Andries Carpentière or Charpentière (1672–1737) was an English sculptor of French or Flemish descent active in Britain in the early 18th century. His name is sometimes anglicised as Andrew Carpenter. He worked in both marble and lead.

Biography
He was first recorded in London in 1702. For some years he worked as principal assistant to John Nost before setting up his own studio – by 1714 he had established a lead-statue-making business on Piccadilly and he produced several garden sculptures in that material. He worked at Cannons for James Brydges, 1st Duke of Chandos and at Wrest Park.

Works

Venus – Lyme Park
Fame – Powis Castle
Tomb monument to Sir John Crewe (attributed) – St Helen's Church, Tarporley
Meleager
Tombs to the Booth family in St Mary's Church, Bowdon

Notes

References

Further reading
 

British sculptors
1672 births
1737 deaths
English people of French descent
English people of Flemish descent